Pirca Pirca (possibly from Quechua pirqa wall) is an archaeological site in Peru. It is located in the La Libertad Region, Bolívar Province, Uchumarca District. Pirca Pirca was declared a National Cultural Heritage of Peru by the National Institute of Culture by Resolución Directoral Nacional No. 075-INC on December 30, 1998. The site lies on top of the mountain named Pirca Pirca.

References

Archaeological sites in La Libertad Region
Archaeological sites in Peru
Mountains of Peru